Nocturnus, currently Nocturnus AD, is an American death metal band formed in Tampa, Florida, in 1987 by the drummer/vocalist Mike Browning (formerly of Morbid Angel). They were known for their science-fiction themed lyrics and use of keyboards, both of which were virtually unknown in extreme metal at the time. The 1990 debut from the band is considered by some to be the first progressive death metal album.

History

Formation
Nocturnus was formed in 1987 by drummer/vocalist Mike Browning following the breakup of his old band Incubus. The band was formed by Browning, former Incubus guitarist Gino Marino and former Agent Steel bassist Richard Bateman. The band eventually began working on material and added second guitarist Vincent Crowley. This first lineup recorded one self-titled demo in 1987. Crowley quit (going on to form Acheron) and was replaced by then-unknown 18-year-old guitar prodigy Mike Davis, who was also Marino's cousin. Bateman quit shortly afterwards to join Nasty Savage.

Nocturnus added new bassist Jeff Estes and a keyboard player, Louis Panzer, in 1988. Panzer's addition made the band unique in the death metal scene and provided the band with an atmosphere that enhanced their increasingly science fiction-themed lyrical content and image. This lineup put out the Science of Horror demo.  In 1989, Marino quit and was replaced by Davis's long time friend and neighbor Sean McNenney.  With both Davis and McNenney being highly technical players, their often dueling and very fast guitar solos became another focal point of the band.

The Key

In 1989, thanks in large part to Mike Davis's friendship with Morbid Angel guitarist Trey Azagthoth, the band signed to Earache Records. The band recorded their debut album, The Key with Tom Morris, which was released in 1990. The album, filled with a unique occult-meets-sci-fi concept (a blend of Browning and Davis's influences, respectively), virtuoso guitar pyrotechnics and space-age-ish keyboards, managed to become a death metal hit, spawning tracks such as "Standing In Blood" and "BC/AD (Before Christ/After Death)". It has gone on to sell 70,000 copies worldwide. It also featured backing vocals by former Mantas/Death and then-Massacre vocalist Kam Lee.

During the recording of The Key, Jeff Estes began developing a major drinking problem that negatively affected his bass playing skills, and Mike Davis ended up playing much of the bass on the album. Estes was fired shortly after and was replaced by Jim O'Sullivan. With O'Sullivan on board, the band toured for The Key in 1991 in support of Bolt Thrower, and then embarked on the Grindcrusher tour with Morbid Angel, Napalm Death, and Godflesh.  O'Sullivan ended up not working out and he was fired as soon as the band's tours were over.

Thresholds

In 1992, the band decided to get a full-time vocalist, allowing Browning to concentrate solely on drumming and because Earache promised the band a music video if they got a "real" frontman.  Former Tortured Soul vocalist Dan Izzo was brought in on lead vocals. The band hired session bassist Chris Anderson to play on their next album, Thresholds.

With Browning becoming less involved in the band's songwriting, Thresholds saw the band moving in a much more space and sci-fi oriented direction lyrically.  Musically, the album was less unrelenting and more diverse than The Key, including an instrumental track ("Nocturne in Bm"), employment of acoustic guitars ("Arctic Crypt"), and exotic percussion ("Tribal Voudon"). The album did not sell quite as well as The Key, perhaps due to the band's more mature direction.  Despite this, it was generally favorably received by critics and fans for its ambitious and unique progressive direction. "Alter Reality" was released as a single with a music video, and "Arctic Crypt" and "Subterranean Infiltrator" also became fan favorites.  The band also got a new permanent bassist Emo Mowery (formerly of Malediction) and had a European tour for Thresholds, during which time the band was unsatisfied with Earaches lack of promotion leading them to make little money off the tour.

After the band returned home to the United States, musical differences between Mike Browning and the rest of the band became increasingly apparent. This culminated in Sean McNenney and Louis Panzer, behind Brownings back, ensuring rights to the bandname "Nocturnus", which they also signed Mike Davis onto, but not Izzo or Mowery. Browning was fired from the band shortly after, and to this day there is bad blood between the McNenney/Panzer and Browning camps. Browning was replaced by James Marcinek.

The new Nocturnus lineup began recording new songs for a third album, including "Mummified", "The Invertebrate Plague", "The Great Spot", and "Orbital Decay", all of which were written by Davis/McNenney/Panzer. However around this time the band began to lose label support from Earache as their contract was dropped.  The new lineup put out a two song self-titled EP in 1993, which featured a recycled early song "Possess The Priest" and the brand new "Mummified".  However Panzer, McNenney, and Marcinek all departed the band after this, and the band effectively split. During this time most of the band members effectively fell off the musical grid, with the exception of Mike Davis's work on a project with Trey Azagthoth which never saw the light of day.

Ethereal Tomb

In the late 1990s, Sean McNenney and Louis Panzer began playing together again, writing ambient metal riffs. Eventually deciding that these new ideas could work as new Nocturnus material, Mike Davis and Emo Mowery were readded to the fold, along with new drummer Rick Bizarro. In 1999 Nocturnus released their comeback album Ethereal Tomb, now on Seasons of Mist. The album had a more refined and ambient sound than the band's previous work. However, in 2002 the band finally split up for good.

Second break-up, aftermath, reformation, and Paradox
Since the dissolution of Nocturnus, the most active former member has been Emo Mowery, playing in bands such as Leash Law in Florida.  At a certain point Louis Panzer reformed an old band called Cry Blue, which Mike Browning described as "Sting type music", though he was known to be involved in the software industry and living in North Carolina. Currently, he is the executive director of North Carolina 8-1-1. Browning has been involved in a wide variety of projects, currently After Death, which bears a style similar to a less technical Nocturnus. The other members of the band have been inactive in music as far as is known, with former guitarist Mike Davis in particular having gained quite a mystique (false rumors of his death circulated in 2008, and he is often falsely credited with playing guitar in Rob Halford's solo band, misattributed to be Halford's bassist of the same name).

Post-breakup the band has made two releases, The Nocturnus Demos, a collection of the band's pre-Earache recordings, and Farewell To Planet Earth, a DVD of live shows from various periods.

In late 2008 Browning toured with his own band After Death under the Nocturnus name for two exclusive UK dates one at BUSK in Birmingham and the other in London plus some European gigs.

In May 2013, Earache Records began a Kickstarter campaign to gather pledges for Thresholds to be re-released for the first time since its official release date in 1992 using the original DAT master tape, successfully reaching its goal in July. Also in 2013, After Death performed under the Nocturnus name once more for a Mexican tour. On 24 September 2013, it was announced that Nocturnus would play Maryland Deathfest 2014, and perform their album The Key in its entirety. Shortly after, the band reformed as Nocturnus A.D., containing every member from After Death.

On May 24, 2019, Nocturnus AD released their fourth studio album, Paradox, through Profound Lore Records.

Members

Current
Mike Browning - Drums, Lead Vocals (1987–1992, 2013–present)
Demian Heftel - Guitars (2013–present)
Belial Koblak - Guitars, Backing Vocals (2013–present)
Daniel Tucker - Bass (2013–present)
Josh Holdren - Keyboards (2017–present)

Former
Mike Davis - Guitars (1988–1993, 1999–2002)
Sean McNenney - Guitars (1989–1993, 1999–2002)
Louis Panzer - Keyboards (1988–1993, 1999–2002)
Emo Mowery - Bass (1992–1993, 1999–2002), Lead Vocals (1999-2002)
Chris Bieniek - Drums (2002)
Dan Izzo - Lead Vocals (1992–1993)
Gino Marino - Guitar (1987–1988; died 2017)
Vincent Crowley - Guitar (1987)
Richard Bateman - Bass (1987; died 2018)
Jeff Estes - Bass (1988–1991)
Jim O' Sullivan - Bass (1991) (live only)
Chris Anderson - Bass (1992) (session only)
James Marcinek - Drums (1992–1993)
Rick Bizarro - Drums (1999–2002)
Nocturnal - Keyboards (2013–2017)
Jason Kiss - Keyboards (2017)

Timeline

Discography

Albums
1990 The Key
1992 Thresholds
1999 Ethereal Tomb
2019 Paradox (as Nocturnus AD)

EP
1993 Nocturnus

Demos
1987 Nocturnus (demo)
1988 The Science of Horror (demo)
2004 The Nocturnus Demos (compilation)

DVD
2004 Farewell to Planet Earth (DVD)

References

External links
Fan site
Metal Archives page

American technical death metal musical groups
American progressive metal musical groups
Musical groups from Tampa, Florida
Musical groups established in 1987
Musical groups disestablished in 1994
Death metal musical groups from Florida
Earache Records artists
Season of Mist artists